Martin King Arthur (born 15 April 1990) popularly known as Kofi Kinaata is a Ghanaian musician and songwriter from Takoradi. He is noted for his Fante rap and freestyle and therefore known as the Fante Rap God (FRG). Apart from his rap prowess, he has grown into a very good singer taking the highlife genre by storm.

Early life and education 
Kofi Kinaata was born on the 15th of April 1990 and raised in Effiakuma, a residential town in the Western Region of Ghana. He attended Nana Brempong Yaw School and completed his secondary education at the Takoradi Technical Institute.

Music career 
Just after High school, Kofi Kinaata participated in the Melody FM (Kasahari) rap competition and emerged as the second runner-up in 2009. He released his first single "Obi Ne Ba" in 2011.

He is noted for his lyrical dexterity in terms of unique rhyme schemes and humorous Fante rap style with a touch of traditional African proverbs in his local language to entertain and educate. In February 2020, he won the Hybrid song of the year at the Ghana National Gospel Music Awards 2019.

Kofi Kinaata has won songwriter of the year in the Ghana Music Awards. for three consecutive times.

In December 2015, he released a song "Made in Taadi" which was a jam for most Fante people due to the link to their famous "Ankos" (Fancy dress and Masqueraders Xmas Carnival) annual festival which happens during Christmas.

Sweetie-pie 
Sweetpie is a love song of its kind. The song starts with a great sensation expressing a great kind of love. Although the lyric was done in Fante, fans love the beats to the song. This is a perfect song for a date. It creates the right mood for a romantic setting. Kin Dee is the producer responsible for this great work.

Confession 
In 2016, he released "Confession" with most people relating the song to "Jesus Take The Wheel".

An abridged English version of the lyrics to the song, has been adopted by the English department of the Kwame Nkrumah University of Science and Technology for a Level 200 semester course (English Literature 263).

The song became Avram Grant's favorite Ghanaian track as at the time it was released. He told Bola Ray in his last interview before he retired as a Ghana Black Stars Coach.

Kinaata's "Confession" was used in 2017 as the theme song by the Minority party (NDC) as a tease to the majority in parliament (NPP) to describe the state of the nation.

The Ghana Black Stars also did a "Confession" group dance as a form of celebration anytime a goal was scored, during the AFCON 2017 Tournament.

The song received considerable playtime and moved to the Top 10 in Ghana in 2016. He won the Song Writer of the Year and Best New Artiste of the Year awards at the 2016 edition of the Ghana Music awards.

Things Fall Apart 
Things Fall Apart, a 2019 release has topped charts across music platforms, including iTunes Ghana Top 100, Audiomack Ghana Top 20 and Boomplay AfroBeats charts for weeks. The song which was produced by TwoBars was warmly received by music enthusiasts as one of the most well written songs so far. The song has been widely played, circulated and shared on both traditional and social media, it has been number 1 on Twitter trends. The song has also been number one on YouTube's Ghana trends with fellow celebrities giving it rave rating: Asamoah Gyan, Michael Essien, Kwami Sefa Kai, Phillip Osei Bonsu, Sadick Adams, KiDi, Efya, Berla Mundi, Joe Beecham among others.

Thy Grace

Thy Grace is one his song making waves in Ghana's Music. Many celebrities have jumped in videoing themselves dancing to the new banger.

A notable line in the song like ''Charcoal seller ba nu so hye  white''- translated ''Charcoal seller son too now wears white''.

This buttresses many views on how his songs are lyrically touching and sensible.

Collaborations 
Kofi Kinaata has done major collaborations with artistes such as; Sarkodie, Shatta Wale, Samini, Stonebwoy, Kwesi Arthur, Jayso, Castro, Becca among others. One major collaboration that blew him to the mainstream and limelight was "Odo Pa" by Castro which featured Kinaata and Ghana Black Stars captain Asamoah Gyan. The track was a hit all over the continent and won awards locally and internationally. Castro was a god-father and an inspiration to him since he grew up seeing him, and help him with his entry in the industry.

Obase Aboli, a Cameroonian musician has also disclosed his keen interest to collaborate with the Fante Rap God to bring out a hit song.

Management 
Samini and Tony Pun signed Kofi Kinaata unto the Samini Music/ High Grade Family record label in 2013. Kofi Kinaata left the label in 2018 after his 5-year contract with the management ended. He's currently an independent artiste with 'Team Move Music' which he heads as his management.

Made in Taadi Concert
The annual ‘Made in Taadi Concert’ is one of the biggest musical concert in the Western and Central Regions of Ghana. The concert attracts fans of Kofi Kinaata and people from all classes in society. Fans travel far and near for this concert.

The show has been witnessed by fellow artists such as; Stonebwoy, Sarkodie, Shatta Wale, Pappy Kojo, Joey B, Kwaw Kese, Medikal, Kidi, Edem, etc.

In 2019, it was listed as one of the top 100 events in Ghana by Ghana Event Awards.

Endorsements 
Kofi Kinaata was made a brand ambassador of Good Day Energy Drink on Thursday, June 24, at Lesfam in Madina, Accra. In May 2021, he was unveiled together with Diana Hamilton as the Brand Ambassadors of Enterprise Life. He is also a Goodwill ambassador for UN's International Organization for Migration (IOM).

Videography

Awards and nominations

Discography

Singles

References

External links
Facebook
Twitter

Living people
People from Western Region (Ghana)
21st-century Ghanaian male singers
21st-century Ghanaian singers
Ghanaian highlife musicians
Ghanaian rappers
1990 births